Hilda May Hatt (28 April 1903 – 1975) was a British athlete. She competed in the high jump, long jump and 100 yd hurdles and relay 4x175 metres. She participated in the 1921 Women's Olympiad, 1922 Women's Olympiad and the 1922 Women's World Games and 1922 Women's World Games and won two gold, four silver and one bronze medals.

In 1923 she participated in the first WAAA Championships and became british champion in the high jump.

In 1924 she participated in the 1924 Women's Olympiad and won the silver medal in running 1000 m and hurdling 120 yards.

References

1903 births
1975 deaths
British female high jumpers
British female long jumpers
British female hurdlers
Women's World Games medalists